The Korutepe Tunnel, is a motorway tunnel constructed on the Istanbul–Ankara motorway   in Kocaeli Province, northwestern Turkey.

It is situated on the Korutepe Hill west of İzmit. The Gültepe Tunnel follows it in the west direction.

The tunnel was constructed in the 1980s. During the 1999 İzmit earthquake, the tunnel was light damaged. In 2012, the tunnel's both tubes were reinforced. In the time period of 2013–2014, the tunnel was modernized for traffic safety. Around 55,000 vehicles pass through the tunnel in both directions daily.

See also
 List of motorway tunnels in Turkey

References

External links
 Map of road tunnels in Turkey at General Directorate of Highways (Turkey) (KGM)

Road tunnels in Turkey
Transport in Kocaeli Province
İzmit